Tieck may refer to:
Christian Friedrich Tieck (1776–1851), German sculptor
Dorothea Tieck (1799–1841), German translator
Ludwig Tieck (1773–1853), German poet
8056 Tieck, asteroid named after Ludwig Tieck
Schlegel-Tieck Prize, literary award named after Ludwig Tieck (and August Schlegel)
Sophie Tieck (1775–1833), German Romantic writer and poet